The Dingees are a band formed in Orange County, California in 1996.

Other Projects
Matt Hernandez played in Project 86 and Unashamed.
Tony Terusa is currently in The O.C. Supertones and was in Saved.
Ethan Luck was in many bands, most notably : Demon Hunter, The O.C. Supertones, Project 86, and Relient K.

Lineup

 Matthew "Pegleg" Roberts: vocals, guitar, alto saxophone (1996–present)
 Dave Chevalier: tenor saxophone, vocals, keys (1996–present)
 Matt "Bean" Hernandez: bass (1996–present)
 Aaron Landers: guitar (1998–present)
 Scott Rodgers: drums (1999–present)

Former members

 Tony Terusa: drums (1996–1997)
 Jon Bon: trombone (1996–1998)
 Jeff Holmes: guitar (1996–1998)
 Ethan Luck: drums (1997-1999)
Brad Ber - guitar
Travis Larsen - trombone
Steven Dail - drums

Discography

Studio albums
 Armageddon Massive (1998)
 Sundown to Midnight (1999)
 The Crucial Conspiracy (2001)
 Rebel Soul Sound System (2010)
 4th Wave (as Peg & the Rejected) (2016)

Compilation appearances
"Wake Up" from Skanktified (1998)
"Another Burnin' City" from Songs From the Penalty Box, Vol. 2 (1998)
"We Three Kings" from Happy Christmas (album) (1998)
"Bullet Proof" and "Calm Down" from Moms Like Us Too - Volume One: A BEC Records Compilation (1999)
"Bullet Proof" from Propska One (1999)
"Staff Sgt. Skreba" from Songs From the Penalty Box, Vol. 3 (1999)
"In My Heart" from Tooth & Nail Records * BEC Recordings present...Fall 1999 Sampler (1999)
"Leave the Kids Alone" from Cheapskates: The Harder Side (2000)
"Spraypaint" from Songs From the Penalty Box, Vol. 4 (2000)
"Trial Tribulation" from The Solution to Benefit Heal the Bay (2000)
"Dear John Letter (To the Devil)" from Start Right Here: Remembering the Life of Keith Green (2001)
"Summer" from Safety First (2001)

External links
 The Dingees on Myspace

Punk rock groups from California
Tooth & Nail Records artists
American ska musical groups

Musical groups from Orange County, California